Into The Fight 2023 was a professional wrestling event promoted by DDT Pro-Wrestling (DDT). It took place on February 26, 2023, in Tokyo, Japan, at Korakuen Hall. The event aired live on Fighting TV Samurai and on DDT's streaming service Wrestle Universe.

Background
Into The Fight is an event held each year since 2005 (except in 2006 and 2022) at Korakuen Hall (except the 2015 edition which was held at Shinjuku Face). The 2023 edition was the seventeenth event under that name.

Storylines
The show featured nine professional wrestling matches that resulted from scripted storylines, where wrestlers portrayed villains, heroes, or less distinguishable characters in the scripted events that built tension and culminated in a wrestling match or series of matches.

Event
The first seven matches of the show were broadcast on DDT's YouTube channel. In the first one, Damnation T.A (MJ Paul and Kanon) picked up a win over Masahiro Takanashi and Antonio Honda by submission. Next, the bout between Pheromones (Yuki "Sexy" Iino and Danshoku "Dandy" Dino) and Toru Owashi, Gota Ihashi, Saki Akai, Kazuki Hirata, and Bonnō Dai Shachō (Sanshiro Takagi and Fuminori Abe) ended in a no contest after referee stoppage. Next up, Keigo Nakamura, Toui Kojima and Kazuma Sumi defeated Hideki Okatani, Yuki Ishida and Illusion by pinfall in six-man tag team action. The fourth bout saw Kazusada Higuchi and Shishamo Power outmatching Jun Akiyama and Unagi Mask in tag team action. In the fifth match, Kip Sabian, Chris Brookes and Hagane Shinno defeated Omega (Yuji Hino and Makoto Oishi) and DDT Universal Champion Naruki Doi. After the match, Sabian pinned Penelope Ford who accompanied his team at ringside to strip her off the Ironman Heavymetalweight Championship. Next up, Takeshi Masada defeated Yuya Koroku to become the first-ever D Generations Cup Champion. The seventh bout saw Shinya Aoki, Yuki Ueno and Super Sasadango Machine defeating Burning (Tetsuya Endo, Kotaro Suzuki and Yusuke Okada) to win the KO-D 6-Man Tag Team Championship. After the match, Kip Sabian dropped the Ironman Heavymetalweight Championship to Yoshihiko. In the semi main event, ShunMao (Mao and Shunma Katsumata) defeated Yukio Sakaguchi and Hikaru Machida to secure their third consecutive defense over the KO-D Tag Team Championship.

In the main event, Yukio Naya defeated Harashima to become the number one contender to the KO-D Openweight Championship.

Results

References

External links
The official DDT Pro-Wrestling website

2023
2023 in professional wrestling
Professional wrestling in Tokyo